

Arms by Diocese

References

Armorials of the United Kingdom
Scottish Episcopal Church